The 2018–19 Gabon Championnat National D1 (known as Gabon Oil National Foot 1 for sponsorship reasons) will be the 51st season in top-flight football in Gabon.

The competition began on 23 February 2019. Although the competition is scheduled to take place wholly within 2019, it is regarded as the 2018–19 season.

Teams

First stage
The top two teams from Groups A and B and the top teams from Groups C and D advance to the Championship playoff.

Group A

Group B

Group C

Group D

Championship playoff

Championship playoff clubs' stadiums

References

External links

Gabon Championnat National D1 seasons
Gabon
Championnat National D1